The Japanese whiptail or Japanese butterfish (Pentapodus nagasakiensis) is a species of marine fish in the coral bream family (Nemipteridae) of order Perciformes. It is native to the western Pacific Ocean.

Distribution
It is found in the western Pacific from southern Japan, the South China Sea, and Indonesia (Lombok) to northern Australia. The fish have been reported from Lizard Island and Lihou Reef in the Great Barrier Reef.

Description 
The maximum recorded size of this species is 20 cm. Its color is tan or yellow grading to white on the belly, often with a pair of yellowish stripes separated by a white band centrally on the sides. Its pelvic fins are moderately long, reaching to or almost to the level of the anus. Lobes of its caudal fin are pointed, and more or less equal in length.

Habitat 
Generally seen below 15 m deep in deeper offshore waters, it occasionally ventures into shallow estuaries and harbors. Usually, it is found solitary or in small groups. It feeds on small shrimp.

Conservation status
Not evaluated
Other noteworthy information (life-cycle, breeding, etc.)

Etymology
The generic name Pentapodus is from the Greek, pente = five and pous = feet. The specific name nagasakiensis means of Nagasaki.

References

External links 
 Fishes of Australia : Pentapodus nagasakiensis

Japanese whiptail
Fish of Japan
Marine fauna of East Asia
Marine fish of Northern Australia
Japanese whiptail